
Year 245 (CCXLV) was a common year starting on Wednesday (link will display the full calendar) of the Julian calendar. At the time, it was known as the Year of the Consulship of Philippus and Titianus (or, less frequently, year 998 Ab urbe condita). The denomination 245 for this year has been used since the early medieval period, when the Anno Domini calendar era became the prevalent method in Europe for naming years.

Events 
 By place 
 Roman Empire 
 Emperor Philip the Arab entrusts Trajan Decius with an important command on the Danube.
 In Britain, many thousands of acres of modern-day Lincolnshire are inundated by a great flood.
 The philosopher Plotinus goes to live in Rome.

 Asia 
 Lady Triệu, a Vietnamese warrior, begins her 3-year resistance against the invading Chinese.

Births 
 Iamblichus, Syrian Neoplatonist philosopher (approximate date)

Deaths 
 Ammonius Saccas, Alexandrian-Greek philosopher (approximate date)
 Lu Xun (or Boyan), Chinese general and statesman (b. 183)
 Wu (or Wu Xian), Chinese empress of the Shu Han state
 Wu Can (or Kongxiu), Chinese official and politician
 Zhao Yan (or Boran), Chinese official and general (b. 171)
 Zhang Xiu (or Shusi), Chinese general and statesman (b. 205)

References